Watermans Art Centre is a combined arts centre. It is located in Brentford, England alongside the banks of the River Thames overlooking Kew Gardens in West London, England.

It includes a 239-seat theatre, a 125-seat cinema two galleries and two studio spaces.

History

Building
Built on the site of gas works, Watermans Arts Centre was in planning for 15 years. A trust was put in place in 1975 and there was a fundraising drive. The Hounslow Arts Trust managed to raise around £150,000 but it was not enough to build the centre. A planning deal was made with the developer of offices adjoining the current site which, along with the Trust's money, paid for the construction. It took about three years to build and cost about £2m. The building was designed by the architectural firm Oscar Garry & Partners. The original building contained a theatre, cinema, and gallery. The two studios are a later addition. John Baraldi was the first director of the arts centre.

Music
The first event in the theatre was a concert by sitar player Ravi Shankar.

Watermans established a reputation for live music and early raves took place there. In fact, the term Acid Jazz was originally coined by DJ Gilles Peterson at one of Nicky Holloway's Special Branch gigs at the Watermans in late 1987. Gilles Peterson recollected that "Acid jazz happened when Bangsy and me were playing at the Waterman's Art Centre in Brentford. A one-off gig by Nicky Holloway. I think Paul Oakenfold or Pete Tong were DJing. It was all ‘get on one, matey’ and it was banging acid house."

On 19 August 1988, alternative rock band Spacemen 3 gave an unusual live performance. An Evening of Contemporary Sitar Music took place in the foyer to act as a prelude to a screening of the film Wings of Desire. Peter Kember, Jason Pierce and Will Carruthers were joined by Rugby musician Steve Evans. They played a 45-minute jam, based around a single chord strummed by Evans, featuring riffs from some of the songs from their as yet unreleased Playing with Fire material. This performance was recorded and was later released, in 1990, as Dreamweapon.

The performance was not well received at the time. Pat Fish said "it was fucking beautiful, but in this setting it was really, really annoying people. It was quite loud in the room... tempers were beginning to fray."

Fiction
Robert Rankin held a position as the Writer in Residence of Watermans during the 1980s and organised a regular poetry event which he claims was the largest in Britain. Rankin's The Brentford Trilogy is a series of nine novels humorously chronicling the lives of a couple of drunken middle-aged layabouts who confront the forces of darkness in Brentford.

In that decade. there were several reported sightings of a Griffin near Watermans. John Baraldi reported that "a woman came from the parking along the street. She was in an awful state. She had seen a huge bird and was obviously rather shaken by it." Robert Rankin said "it has been a local myth for years. There were sightings of the ones prior to the last year. Previous ones go back to at least before the Second World War. A year ago a jogger called John Olssen reported seeing the bird as he was running by the arts centre. And a woman saw it from the top of a bus." The legend went on to be referenced in Rankin's book Web Site Story.

Asian-British arts
During the 1990s, Watermans was known for focusing on South Asian arts. Doctor Alda Terracciano argued that "the last decade has witnessed the rapidly increasing achievements of a number of British Asian playwrights, directors and actors – a trend fostered by the support of venues such as the Watermans Arts Centre," noting that the comedy circuit benefited from Watermans' support through the regular 'One Nation Under a Groove...Innit' event which "offered the opportunity to a number of emerging Asian comedians to exercise their skills before being cast in proper comedy dramas." Actor Sanjeev Bhaskar's musical comedy double act "The Secret Indians (non-Asian)" performed at Watermans.

Other performers
Comedian Jo Brand visited in 2008. She said of Watermans that "these sort of places are important for local people in west London. You have the West End but the average person cannot afford that, so their only access to theatre is somewhere like Watermans." She also noted: "I was in a stand-up show there about 20 years ago." Other notable names who have appeared include Peter Greenaway, Elvis Costello, Mica Paris, Meera Syal, Melvin Bragg and Shabana Azmi.

Present

Watermans presents a year-round programme of independent cinema, children's theatre, cabaret, dance, music, talks and creative workshops. Watermans also works across the borough of Hounslow, bringing outdoor arts to Bell Square, a purpose-built outdoor arts space in Hounslow Town Centre. It leads the Creative People and Places Hounslow consortium, which is a 10 year programme funded by Arts Council England to help engage new audiences in the arts.

During the Covid lockdowns Watermans instituted a fortnightly film club 'No Ticket Required' to continue its film programming and support its audiences.

References

1975 establishments in England
Arts organizations established in 1975
Theatres in the London Borough of Hounslow
Cultural and educational buildings in London
Media and communications in the London Borough of Hounslow
Arts centres in London